Florian Schieder (born 30 March 1995) is an Italian World Cup alpine ski racer and specializes in the speed events of downhill and super-G.

World Cup results

Season standings

Race podiums
 0 wins
 1 podium – (1 DH), 1 top ten

World Championship results

References

External links
 
 

1995 births
Living people
Italian male alpine skiers
Alpine skiers of Centro Sportivo Carabinieri